Spilomyia obscura is a species of Hoverfly in the family Syrphidae.

Distribution
Mexico.

References

Eristalinae
Insects described in 1902
Taxa named by Daniel William Coquillett
Diptera of North America
Hoverflies of North America